Lynn Michelle Jurich (born  1979) is an American businesswoman and investor who is the co-founder and former CEO of Sunrun, a home solar power installation, financing, and leasing company headquartered in San Francisco, California. In addition to leading Sunrun, Jurich is also an angel investor.

Career
Jurich co-founded Sunrun in 2007 with Stanford Graduate School of Business classmates Edward Fenster and Nat Kreamer.

Jurich was named one of the Ten Most Powerful Women Entrepreneurs by Fortune magazine in 2009, and received the 2010 Ernst & Young Entrepreneur of the Year award in the Northern California region and was a national finalist together with SunRun co-founder Ed Fenster. In 2013, Jurich was named one of Fast Company's Most Creative People in Business. Forbes magazine listed her as one of their Women to Watch in 2015.

Jurich served on the board of directors of the Sierra Club and holds an MBA and BS in science, technology, and society from Stanford University.

In July 2018, Jurich was listed on Fortune magazine's 40 Under 40 list as one of the most influential people in business under the age of 40. That same year, Inc. Magazine named Lynn as one of the top 100 Female Founders. The honor recognizes female visionaries who are creating jobs and changing the world.

Personal life
Jurich lives in San Francisco with her husband, Brad Murray, who is president of the cosmetics company Tatcha. Jurich has two children.

See also
List of chief executive officers
List of female top executives

References

1970s births
Living people
21st-century American businesspeople
Stanford University alumni
21st-century American businesswomen
Sierra Club people